Louise Latham (September 23, 1922 – February 12, 2018) was an American actress, perhaps best known for her portrayal of Bernice Edgar in Alfred Hitchcock's 1964 film Marnie.

Early years
Latham came from Hamilton, Texas, from a family of ranchers, "mostly around San Saba and Mason Counties in Texas." She graduated from Dallas' Sunset High School. Latham was a Democrat who donated over $500 to the Friends of Lois Capps in the 2000 election.

Career

Television
Most of Latham's work was on television. In 1965, she made two appearances on Perry Mason, both roles as the murderer: Matilda Shore in "The Case of the Careless Kitten" and Shirley Logan in "The Case of the Cheating Chancellor".

She made an appearance on The Waltons, playing Olivia's Aunt Kate, who consoles Olivia through her ordeal with menopause. She also appeared in The Alfred Hitchcock Hour, Bonanza, Gunsmoke, Kojak, Hawaii Five-O, Ironside, Columbo, Quincy, M.E., Rhoda, Murder, She Wrote, and The Streets of San Francisco. On Family Affair, she appeared as Aunt Fran, who leaves Buffy (Anissa Jones) in the care of Uncle Bill (Brian Keith) in the show's first episode. On Bonanza in the 1966 episode "A Real Nice, Friendly Little Town", she was Willie Mae Rikeman, and in the 1971 episode "The Silent Killer", she was Mrs. Harriet Clinton). She appeared on Designing Women as Perky, the mother of Julia and Suzanne Sugarbaker, The X-Files, and The Invaders in the 1967 episode "Genesis". Latham's character (Betsy Chandler) was the first to learn the real circumstances of Dr. Richard Kimble's wife's death (Helen) in the final episode of The Fugitive (1967). She was a regular in the cast of the short-lived 1976 CBS series Sara.

Film
Latham's role in Marnie (1964), her film debut, proved to be a turning point in her career. A newspaper's photo caption in 1965 noted:A stage actress, Louise now leans to making films because "Marnie changed my life, satisfied my soul," she says, "now I want some more of the same."

She also appeared in such films as Firecreek (1968), Adam at 6 A.M. (1970), White Lightning (1973), The Sugarland Express (1974), Mass Appeal (1984), The Philadelphia Experiment (1984), Paradise (1991), and Love Field (1992).

Stage
Latham's Broadway credits include the 1956 revival of Major Barbara, Invitation to a March (1960), and Isle of Children (1962).

Her other stage performances included work "under the personal direction of Margo Jones" in Theater '54 in Dallas, Texas. In 1958, she was in a touring company that performed Cat on a Hot Tin Roof.

Personal life and death
Latham was married twice, first to Raymond Pittman and then to TV producer Paul Picard (both unions ending in divorce). She died on February 12, 2018, at Casa Dorinda, a retirement community in Montecito, California, at the age of 95.

Filmography

Film

Television

References

External links

 

1922 births
2018 deaths
20th-century American actresses
Actresses from Texas
American film actresses
American memoirists
American stage actresses
American television actresses
California Democrats
Texas Democrats
People from Hamilton, Texas
People from Montecito, California
American women memoirists
21st-century American women